Zasa parish is an administrative unit of Jēkabpils Municipality, Latvia.

Towns, villages and settlements of Zasa parish 

Parishes of Latvia
Jēkabpils Municipality